DIPC may stand for the following:

 Chemistry

 N,N'-Diisopropylcarbodiimide, a reagent used in peptide synthesis

 Scientific Organizations

 Donostia International Physics Center